Crescent Lake is located approximately  north of Big Lake. The lake sits at just over  elevation on the Apache-Sitgreaves National Forests, as such the facilities located here are managed by that authority. Access is restricted in the winter when roads are closed due to snow, generally December to early April.

Description

It's a highly productive lake, which allows trout to gain size quickly. However, the lake is shallow, which encourages weed growth and algae blooms, and makes it subject to late summer and winter fish kills. To manage the problem of winter kills, the Arizona Game and Fish stocks the lake with large numbers of catchable rainbow trout and brook trout each spring. In addition, the Arizona Game and Fish removes weeds annually with a floating weed mower.

Fish species
 Rainbow trout
 Brook trout

References

External links
 Arizona Boating Locations Facilities Map
 Arizona Fishing Locations Map

Lakes of Arizona
Lakes of Apache County, Arizona
Apache-Sitgreaves National Forests